The Col de San Quilico or collo di San Quilico is a mountain pass in the Haute-Corse department of Corsica, France.
It is a road pass on Territorial Route 20, between  Corte and Ponte Leccia (Morosaglia).

Location

The Col de San Quilico is a saddle between the mountains that separate Soveria in the north from Tralonca in the south.
These municipalities are in the Regional Natural Park of Corsica, in its "territory of life" called Centru di Corsica.

Topography

The ridge runs through via the Lorca territorial forest and may also be crossed by the  Bocca d'Ominanda and the  Pinzalaccio.
A large part of the ridge line defines the border between the municipalities of Soveria and Tralonca.

The section of the mountain range holding the San Quilico pass divides the central depression or furrow of the island into two zones:
to the north, the Ponte-Leccia basin;
to the south, the Cortenais.

The Col de San Quilico connects the Golo valley, Bastia and the Balagne region to the north, with the Centre Corse (Centru di Corsica) to the south, the Tavignano valley and the east coast of the island, and (beyond the Col de Vizzavona) to Ajaccio and the west coast.

In the immediate environment are:
to the north, the valley of the Ruisseau de Forcalello (or Ruisseau de Santa Maria, as it is called further downstream), a tributary of the Ruisseau de Sumano, a tributary of the Golo river;
to the south, the valley of the Ruisseau de San Quilico (or Ruisseau de Bistuglio), a tributary of the Tavignano river near the town of Corte.
On the northern slope, the plant cover is made up of groves of holm oaks and cork oaks, more verdant than on the south side, where only low and sparse maquis grows.

History

San Quilico is a road pass where the N 193 and D41 roads meet. 
It owes its name to a sanctuary further north in the town of Soveria.

In the 1880s, a railway tunnel 500 meters long was bored at an average altitude of  under the pass as part of the new Ajaccio – Bastia line, removing the obstacle of San Quilico.

In 1996, the Corte diversion was created. 
In 1998–1999, a  road tunnel was drilled under the San Quilico pass, above the railway tunnel, for the new route of the former national road 193. 
The “Restaurant du Col” at the pass had to close its doors.

In 2002, the new Corte - Soveria link was opened to traffic, including a tunnel and straightening of the tortuous section passing through Bistuglio and the San Quilico pass.

On January 30, 2014, the former national road 193 passing through the pass officially took the name of T203.
It become a ramp to territorial road 20 which serves the hamlet of Bistuglio. 
The first section of the D41 road at the pass remains, despite the opening of a new access to it  after the southern exit of the road tunnel.

Notes

Sources

Mountain passes of Haute-Corse